This is a list of trials of peers in the House of Lords. Until 1948, peers of the United Kingdom and its predecessor states had the right to trial by their equals.

Further reading
 The Trial of James Thomas, Earl of Cardigan before The Right Honourable The House of Peers, in Full Parliament, for Felony, On Tuesday the 16th Day of February 1841. William Brodie Gurney et al, London, 1841.
 First Report from the Select Committee of the House of Lords on The Trial of the Earl Russell. HL Paper 143 of session 1901.
 Second Report from the Select Committee of the House of Lords on The Trial of the Earl Russell. HL Paper 145 of session 1901.
 Third Report from the Select Committee of the House of Lords on The Trial of the Earl Russell. HL Paper 157 of session 1901.
 Proceedings on the Trial of Earl Russell. HL Paper 165 of session 1901.
 Report By the Select Committee of the House of Lords on the Trial of the Lord de Clifford together with the Proceedings of the Committee. HL Paper 153 of session 1934-35.
 Proceedings on the Trial of the Lord de Clifford. HL Paper 12 of session 1935-36.

Trials of peers
House of Lords cases